The 1950–51 Toronto Maple Leafs season involved winning the Stanley Cup. The Stanley Cup was famous for Bill Barilko scoring the winning goal.

Offseason

Regular season

Final standings

Record vs. opponents

Schedule and results

Player statistics

Regular season
Scoring

Goaltending

Playoffs
Scoring

Goaltending

Playoffs

Stanley Cup Finals
Every game went into overtime in this series. Bill Barilko scored the Cup-winning goal, his last goal in the NHL as he would die in a plane crash during the summer.

Toronto Maple Leafs vs. Montreal Canadiens

Toronto wins best-of-seven series four games to one.

References
Maple Leafs on Hockey Database
Maple Leafs on Database Hockey

Stanley Cup championship seasons
Toronto Maple Leafs seasons
Toronto Maple Leafs season, 1950-51
Tor
1951 Stanley Cup